They Saved Hitler's Brain is a 1968 TV movie directed by David Bradley. It was adapted for television from a shorter 1963 theatrical feature film, Madmen of Mandoras, produced by Carl Edwards and directed by David Bradley. The film was lengthened by about 20 minutes with additional footage shot by UCLA students at the request of the distributor. It is often cited as being one of the worst films ever made.

Plot
World War II is over, and Nazi officials remove Adolf Hitler's living head and hide it in the fictional South American country of Mandoras, so that they can resurrect Nazi Germany in the future. Fast-forwarding into the 1960s, the surviving officials kidnap a scientist with expertise in nerve gas in an attempt to conquer the world. The scientist's son-in-law is a security operative and the scientist's daughter travel to Mandoras to rescue the scientist and foil the evil plot.

Cast
 Walter Stocker as Phil Day
 Audrey Caire as Kathy Coleman "K.C." Day
 Carlos Rivas as Camino Padua / Teo Padua
 John Holland as Prof. John Coleman
 Marshall Reed as Frank Dvorak
 Scott Peters as David Garrick
 Keith Dahle as Tom Sharon
 Dani Lynn as Suzanne Coleman
 Nestor Paiva as Police Chief Alaniz
 Pedro Regas as Presidente Juan Padua
 Bill Freed as Adolf Hitler

Production
Shot in 1962 under the working title The Return of Mr.H, the film was eventually released in 1963 for a limited showing with the title Madmen of Mandoras. Paragon Films acquired the rights to the film and shot 18 more minutes of footage to give a running time of over 90 minutes in order to obtain a higher fee when sold to television where it was included in a package of films.

Parodies in popular culture

In The Simpsons
 The penultimate episode of the 10th season, "They Saved Lisa's Brain" is a play on the film's title.
 The episode "Raging Abe Simpson and His Grumbling Grandson in 'The Curse of the Flying Hellfish' features Abe Simpson remembering a moment during World War II when he had Hitler in his sights. He had muttered "Heh heh heh, now they'll never save your brain, Hitler", but the shot went astray through the clumsy intervention of fellow Hellfish Squad member Montgomery Burns.
 In the episode "Marge Be Not Proud", one of the games in the store "Try-N-Save" is titled "Save Hitler's Brain".
 In the episode "Duffless", one of the items on the conveyor belt is Hitler's head in a jar.
 Simpsons Comics referenced the title in the story "They Saved Homer's Brain" in 1996.

In other media 
The film was mentioned in an episode of Head of the Class titled "Fatal Distraction".
 The film was mentioned by Wesley in an episode of Mr. Belvedere.
 In 1986, the film was featured in an episode of the Canned Film Festival.
 In a story arc in Action Comics from 1988, Lex Luthor, learning that he is dying, stages his own death and has his brain preserved in a jar while wired to a computer, while a new body is cloned for him. He then re-emerges as his supposed illegitimate son Alexander Luthor, Jr. The story arc was collected in 2000 in a trade paperback titled They Saved Luthor's Brain!.
 In Futurama, Professor Farnsworth proclaims "Everyone's always in favor of saving Hitler's brain, but when you put it in the body of a great white shark, oooh, suddenly you've gone too far."
 In Flaming Carrot Comics, the Flaming Carrot is menaced by an army of disembodied clones of Hitler's jackbooted feet.
 The Dead Kennedys song "We've Got a Bigger Problem Now" references Hitler's brain in a jar. The supposed formaldehyde used to preserve Hitler's brain is an ingredient of the Tricky Dicky Screwdriver, a fictional cocktail drink, along with Jack Daniel's and purple Kool-Aid.
 Los Angeles punk band Angry Samoans included the song "They Saved Hitler's Cock" on their 1982 album Back from Samoa.
 In the comic book series Savage Dragon, Hitler's brain is attached to a gorilla body to become the villain Brainape. After being separated from the gorilla, the brain forms legs and runs away.
 An episode of the U.S. cartoon Duckman was entitled "They Craved Duckman's Brain", based on the premise that Duckman, after falling asleep in an active CAT scanner, developed an isotope in his brain that could cure cancer, but getting to it would kill Duckman.
 In honor of the film, the area of the now-defunct PointlessWasteofTime.com forum set aside for serious discussion was titled "We Saved Hitler's Brain". It, along with the rest of the PWOT forums, was migrated to Cracked.com when editor David Wong was employed by Cracked.com as Senior Editor.
 Local H's album Hallelujah! I'm a Bum includes a song titled "They Saved Reagan's Brain".
 Hitler's Brain is a resource card in the game Illuminati: New World Order. 
 The film "won" the First World's Worst Film Festival in Ottawa, Canada in 1979. Bradley was reportedly delighted when he learned his film was crowned the worst ever made.

Reception
The film review aggregator website Rotten Tomatoes gives They Saved Hitler's Brain a rare rating of 0%, based on 5 reviews from critics, with an average rating of 1.3/10. TV Guide described it as "One of the all-time worst". Film critic Danny Peary said it was "A legitimate candidate for Worst Film Ever Made title." It was also one of the selections for The Golden Turkey Awards. Leonard Maltin gave the film the lowest possible rating (BOMB). Maltin said it was "unbelievably muddled" after the addition footage, but he praised Cortez's cinematography.

See also
List of films considered the worst
List of American films of 1963

References

External links 
 
 

1963 films
1968 television films
1968 films
1960s science fiction films
Cultural depictions of Adolf Hitler
American science fiction films
American television films
American black-and-white films
Crown International Pictures films
American independent films
Mad scientist films
Films directed by David Bradley
Nazi exploitation films
Nazi zombie films
1960s English-language films
1960s American films